The 1943–44 Svenska mästerskapet was the 13th season of Svenska mästerskapet, a tournament held to determine the Swedish Champions of men's handball. Teams qualified by winning their respective District Championships. 19 teams competed in the tournament. Majornas IK were the two-time defending champions, and won their fifth title, defeating IFK Karlskrona in the final. The final was played on 2 April in Karlskrona, and was watched by 1,499 spectators.

Results

First round 
Visby AIK–AUS, Uppsala 9–13

Second round
GIF Sundsvall–Sollefteå GIF 16–8
Umeå läroverk–Hornskrokens IF 18–12
AUS, Uppsala–IK Göta 7–13
Örtakoloniens IF–Ludvika FfI 18–10

Third round
GIF Sundsvall–Umeå läroverk 9–4
IK Göta–Örtakoloniens IF 17–10
IF Hallby–IF Leikin 16–8
Västerås HF–IK City 9–3
Norrköpings AIS–Örebro SK 12–14
Karlstads BIK–Majornas IK 9–12

Quarterfinals
GIF Sundsvall–IK Göta 4–25
IFK Karlskrona–IF Hallby 11–9 a.e.t.
Västerås HF–Örebro SK 15–10
Majornas IK–Uddevalla IS w/o

Semifinals
IK Göta–IFK Karlskrona 3–12
Västerås HF–Majornas IK 8–16

Final
IFK Karlskrona–Majornas IK 8–16

Champions 
The following players for Majornas IK received a winner's medal: Bertil Huss, Sven-Eric Forsell (1 goal in the final), Claes Hedenskog, Stig Hjortsberg (2), Torsten Henriksson (1), Åke Gustafsson (3), Gustav-Adolf Thorén (5), Lars Lindstrand, Gunnar Lindgren (3) and Bo Sundby(1).

See also
1943–44 Allsvenskan (men's handball)

References 

Swedish handball competitions